Catocala dejeani is a moth of the family Erebidae first described by Rudolf Mell in 1936. It is found in China (Situan, Shaanxi, Guangxi) and Taiwan.

Some authors consider it a subspecies of Catocala kuangtungensis.

The wingspan is about 67 mm.

Subspecies
Catocala dejeani dejeani
Catocala dejeani chogohtoku Ishizuka, 2002 (China)
Catocala dejeani owadai Ishizuka, 2002 (Taiwan)

References

External links
"Catocala dejeani Mell, 1936　デジュアンキシタバ". Moths of Japan.

Moths described in 1936
dejeani
Moths of Asia
Moths of Taiwan